Koinange can refer to:

Charles Karuga Koinange, colonial and post-colonial African official in Kenya
Jeff Koinange, CNN reporter on African assignments
Koinange Street, a major street in Nairobi, Kenya
Koinange wa Mbiyu, prominent African chief and political leader during Kenya's colonial period
(Peter) Mbiyu Koinange, former Kenyan Foreign Minister

Kenyan names